The copperback  quail-thrush (Cinclosoma clarum) is a species of bird in the family Cinclosomatidae. It was split from the chestnut quail-thrush in 2015. It is endemic to Australia. Its natural habitat is Mediterranean-type shrubby vegetation.

References

copperback quail-thrush
Birds of Western Australia
Endemic birds of Australia
copperback quail-thrush